Reduta is a Czech word meaning a masquerade ball, a building with a dance hall or a part of Baroque fortification (see Redoubt or redout). It may refer to:
 The building of the Slovak Philharmonic. It is called Reduta.
 Reduta Theatre, a theatre situated in Brno, Czech Republic
 Reduta Jazz Club, a music club and theatre situated in Prague, Czech Republic
 Warszawa Reduta Ordona railway station, a  railway station in Poland